Gabriel O. Suárez   (born December 14, 1984) is a professional baseball Manager and former owner of the San Rafael Pacifics.

Playing career
Suárez was originally drafted by the Montreal Expos in the 33rd round of the 2003 MLB Draft out of Arcadia High School in Phoenix, Arizona but did not sign. He was again drafted by the Expos in the 26th round of the 2004 MLB Draft after playing with South Mountain Community College.

After playing parts of two seasons with the Expos/Nationals Gulf Coast League team, he was released and finished out the 2005 season with the Lincoln Saltdogs of the Northern League. He signed a minor league contract with the Colorado Rockies in 2006 and then with the Cincinnati Reds in 2007, but did not get past Class-A.

From 2007-2010 he played primarily in the Atlantic League of Professional Baseball with several different teams. In 2010, he signed a minor league deal with the Philadelphia Phillies and managed to make it to AA with the Reading Phillies.

In 2011, he played with the Kansas City T-Bones in the American Association and the Atlantic League Road Warriors.

In 2012, he played in the Los Angeles Dodgers farm system with the Great Lakes Loons and Rancho Cucamonga Quakes and was then released. He played in the Mexican League with the Vaqueros Laguna and the Delfines de Ciudad del Carmen and after the season was with the Adelaide Bite in the Australian Baseball League. He signed a minor league contract with the Texas Rangers prior to 2013.

He played for the Spain national baseball team in the 2013 World Baseball Classic.

On December 2, 2013 he signed a minor league deal with the San Diego Padres. He was released on March 21, 2014.

Managing career
On March 8, 2017 Gabe Suárez was named of the Manager for the Cleburne Railroaders of the American Association of Independent Professional Baseball. Previously he served as the Manager of the defunct Joplin Blasters during the 2016 season.

Management
In December 2018, the San Rafael Pacifics was purchased by Gabe Suárez.  He sold the team to the Pecos League in 2020.

References

External links

1984 births
Living people
Adelaide Bite players
American expatriate baseball players in Mexico
Atlantic League Road Warriors players
Baseball managers
Camden Riversharks players
Clearwater Threshers players
Delfines de Ciudad del Carmen players
El Paso Diablos players
Florence Freedom players
Great Lakes Loons players
Gulf Coast Expos players
Gulf Coast Nationals players
Kansas City T-Bones players
Lakewood BlueClaws players
Lancaster JetHawks players
Lincoln Saltdogs players
Long Island Ducks players
Mexican League baseball pitchers
Newark Bears players
Rancho Cucamonga Quakes players
Sarasota Reds players
Sportspeople from Denver
Tri-City Dust Devils players
Vaqueros Laguna players
2013 World Baseball Classic players
Joplin Blasters players
American expatriate baseball players in Australia
Baseball players from Denver